Jayiram Samal (born 1948), also known as Jayee, is an Indian actor known for his comic roles in Odia cinema (Ollywood). He is accredited in over 300 works, including films, television serials, and plays. He started his career in the 1970s as a comic actor. He was known for his trademark laugh. He has also appeared in negative roles in some films.

In 2008, Samal was presented with a Lifetime Achievement award at the 40th Banichitra Awards presented by the Banichitra film magazine along with singer Raghunath Panigrahi.

Filmography
1997 "Sabitree"
1996 "Jeevan  Saathi"
1988"Thili Jhia Heli Bohu"
1987 "Jor Jaar Mulak Taar"
1987 "Tunda Baaida"
1994 "Gadhi Janile Ghara Sundar"
1985 "Hakim Babu",
1985"' Jaga Hatare Pagha"
 2002 Sindura Nuhein Khela Ghara
 2013 Om Sai Tujhe Salaam
1992 Anti Churi Tanti Kate
 1984 Jaaiphula
 1984 Jaga Balia
 1984 Janani
 1984 Pratidhwani
 1983 Jheeati Sita Pari
 1983 Kaberi
 1983 Swapna Sagara
 1982 Basanti Apa
 1982 Mu O Se Tume
 1981 Arati
 1981 Bilwa Mangala
 1981 Maana Abhiman
 1980 Danda Balunga
 1979 Sautuni
 1978 Balidan
 1978 Janmadata
 1978 Pati Patni
 1977 Naga Phasa
 1977 Ae Nuhen Kahani
 1976 Krishna Sudama
 1975 Jajabara

Notes
Also credited as Jairam or Jayaram.

References

External links

 

1948 births
Living people
Male actors in Odia cinema
Ollywood
20th-century Indian male actors
21st-century Indian male actors
Place of birth missing (living people)